Chantry High School is the name of several educational institutions.

United Kingdom
Chantry Academy, Chantry, Ipswich, Suffolk
The Chantry School, Martley, Worcestershire